John Bert Rogers (January 18, 1910 – October 1, 1968) was an American football player. Rogers was born in Alexis, Illinois, in 1907 and attended Alexis High School. He played college football at Notre Dame and professional football in the National Football League (NFL) as a center for the Cincinnati Reds in 1933 and 1934. He appeared in 14 NFL games, 11 as a starter. He died in 1968 at age 58.

References

1910 births
1968 deaths
Notre Dame Fighting Irish football players
Cincinnati Reds (NFL) players
Players of American football from Illinois